Kuchek Deh (also Romanized as Kūchek Deh) is a village in Layalestan Rural District, in the Central District of Lahijan County, Gilan Province, Iran. At the 2006 census, its population was 240, in 90 families.

References 

Populated places in Lahijan County